Neofitos Aresti (born 7 March 1958) is a Cypriot judoka. He competed in the men's lightweight event at the 1980 Summer Olympics.

References

External links
 

1958 births
Living people
Cypriot male judoka
Olympic judoka of Cyprus
Judoka at the 1980 Summer Olympics
Place of birth missing (living people)